Connecticut's 36th Senate district elects one member of the Connecticut Senate. The district consists of the towns of Greenwich, North Stamford, and portions of Stamford, New Canaan, and Newfield-Westover-Turn of River.

List of Senators

Election results

2022

2021 (special)

2020

2018

References 

36